Weerawarna is a 2016 Sri Lankan Sinhala action mystery film directed by Shahiru Ranasinghe and produced by Ajith Nishantha Kumara for Total Film Productions. It stars Ravindra Randeniya, Cyril Wickramage and W Jayasiri in lead roles along with Douglas Ranasinghe and Veena Jayakody. Music composed by Upali Kannangara. It is the 1246th Sri Lankan film in the Sinhala cinema.

Plot
A group of teenagers, archaeological enthusiast Cyril Wickramage, and professor Ravindra Randeniya teams up to prevent an archaeological theft by a  person named Salgadu W. Jayasiri.

Cast
 Ravindra Randeniya as Prasad Madugalla
 Cyril Wickramage as Don Almeida 
 W. Jayasiri as Ivan Salgadu
 Douglas Ranasinghe as Ayesha's father
 Veena Jayakody as Suriyasingha's mother
 Gamini Jayalath
 Susantha Chandramali as Ayesha's mother
 Teddy Vidyalankara as Soysa
 Ranjith Rubasinghe as Ranjith

References

External links
මම, මට ඕනෑ විදියට මේ චිත්‍රපටය කළා
වීරවර්ණ 18 වැනිදා එයි
මැණික් පෙට්ටියේ අබිරහස - Plot of Weerawarna

2016 films
2010s Sinhala-language films